John S. Crawford (September 11, 1923 — November 25, 1979) was a member of the Wisconsin State Assembly.

Biography
Crawford was born on September 11, 1923 in Homestead, Pennsylvania. He would graduate from Pennsylvania State University and the University of Wisconsin-Madison. His Master's thesis entitled Italian-American Labor Relations was used as anti-communist propaganda in North Africa. During World War II, he served in the United States Army Air Forces. Crawford was at one point held as a prisoner of war in Italy and would later receive a citation for meritorious service behind enemy lines. He died on November 25, 1979.

Political career
Crawford was elected to the Assembly in 1954, 1956 and 1958. He was a Republican.

References

People from Homestead, Pennsylvania
Republican Party members of the Wisconsin State Assembly
Military personnel from Wisconsin
United States Army Air Forces soldiers
United States Army personnel of World War II
World War II prisoners of war held by Italy
Pennsylvania State University alumni
University of Wisconsin–Madison alumni
1923 births
1979 deaths
20th-century American politicians